Wendy Moniz (born January 19, 1969) is an American television actress.  Her roles include Dinah Marler in the CBS soap opera Guiding Light, as Rachel McCabe in Nash Bridges, and as Louisa Archer in The Guardian. From 2013 to 2014, Moniz starred as Elaine McAllister in ABC drama series Betrayal. Moniz later had recurring roles as Laura Moretti in House of Cards (2015–2016), and as Governor Lynelle Perry in Yellowstone (2018–present).

Career
Moniz made her television debut in the CBS daytime soap opera Guiding Light  as Dinah Marler. She starred as a series regular from 1995 to 1999, and was nominated for two Soap Opera Digest Awards. Moniz later returned as a guest star in 2000 and 2002.

In 1999, Moniz landed a role in the primetime CBS drama pilot Partners. In the same year, she starred as the female lead in the critically acclaimed television film adaptation of Mitch Albom's book Tuesdays with Morrie. She later was a series regular in the short-lived NBC comedy series Battery Park opposite Elizabeth Perkins. In fall of 2000, Moniz was cast as a series regular in the role of Rachel McCabe in the sixth and final season of the CBS series Nash Bridges. She later starred as Louisa "Lulu" Archer on the CBS series The Guardian opposite Simon Baker. The series aired from 2001 to 2004. Moniz guest starred in an episode of the NBC legal drama Law & Order in 2005, and had a recurring role as Stacey Walker in the ABC short-lived comedy-drama Big Shots in 2007. She later appeared as Jill Burnham on the FX series Damages from 2009 to 2010. In 2010 she was cast as Tom Selleck's love interest in the CBS police drama Blue Bloods, but the role was recast with Andrea Roth. She later appeared in the recurring role of Llanview Mayor Finn - who succeeds the exiting Mayor Dorian Lord on the ABC daytime soap opera One Life to Live in 2011. She also appeared in the ABC series 666 Park Avenue in 2012.

In March 2013, Moniz was cast opposite Stuart Townsend, James Cromwell and Hannah Ware in the ABC drama series Betrayal directed by Patty Jenkins and based on the Dutch drama series Overspel. In 2014, Moniz was cast as lead in the independent drama film The Grief of Others directed by Patrick Wang. She later has appeared in Netflix series Daredevil and House of Cards. In 2016, she was cast in a recurring role as a love interest for her real-life husband, Frank Grillo, in the DirecTV drama Kingdom. Since 2018, she has played Governor Lynelle Perry in the Paramount Network drama series Yellowstone. She was promoted to series regular for fifth season.

Personal life
Moniz, of Portuguese and Irish descent, was born in Kansas City, Missouri. She attended Siena College in Loudonville, New York in 1991. She married David Birsner in 1991, but the couple divorced without issue in 1996.  She married her former Guiding Light co-star, Frank Grillo in October 2000, and separated from him in February 2020 and finalised their divorce in September 2020. The couple has two sons.

Filmography

References

External links
 
 

1969 births
Living people
Actresses from Kansas City, Missouri
American people of Portuguese descent
American soap opera actresses
People from Fall River, Massachusetts
American television actresses
Siena College alumni
20th-century American actresses
21st-century American actresses